Sanne may refer to:

Places
Sanne, Germany, a village in Saxony-Anhalt, Germany
Sanne, Nepal, a village in Nepal 
Sanne-Kerkuhn, another village in Saxony-Anhalt, Germany
Salaise-sur-Sanne, commune on the Sanne river, Isère department, France

Feminine given name
Sanne can be a short form of Susanne or a feminine form of the Frisian name Sane.
Sanne Bjerg (born 1965), Danish opera librettist, director and novelist
Sanne Cant (born 1990), Belgian racing cyclist
Sanne Denotté (born 1973), Belgian Flemish singer
Sanne van Dijke (born 1995), Dutch judoka
Sanne Hans (born 1984), Dutch singer-songwriter known as Miss Montreal
Sanne Hoekstra (born 1992), Dutch handball player
Sanne Karlsson (born 1985), Swedish singer-songwriter
Sanne Keizer (born 1985), Dutch beach volleyball player
Sanne Kurz (born 1974), German cinematographer
Sanne Ledermann (1928–1943), Holocaust victim, friend of Anne Frank
Sanne Lennström (born 1988), Swedish politician
Sanne Troelsgaard Nielsen (born 1988), Danish footballer
Sanne Nijhof (born 1987), Dutch model
Sanne van Olphen (born 1989), Dutch handball player
Sanne van Paassen (born 1988), Dutch cyclo-cross racing cyclist
Sanne Putseys (born 1989), Belgian singer-songwriter known as Selah Sue
Sanne Salomonsen (born 1955), Danish singer
Sanne van der Star (born 1986), Dutch speed skater
Sanne Verhagen (born 1992), Dutch judoka
Sanne Vloet (born 1995), Dutch model
Sanne Wevers (born 1991), Dutch gymnast, Olympic champion balance beam
Sanne Wohlenberg, German-born television producer

Surname
Karl Sanne (1869–1945),  Norwegian Minister of Education and Church Affairs
Tom Sanne (born 1975), Norwegian footballer
Werner Sanne (1889–1952), German General during World War II

Other
Sanne Group, a financial services business

Dutch feminine given names